Nicolas Heinrich (born 2 December 2001) is a German road and track cyclist, who currently rides for UCI Continental team .

Major results

Track

2019
 UCI Junior Track World Championships
1st  Team pursuit
2nd  Individual pursuit
 UEC European Junior Track Championships
1st  Individual pursuit
3rd  Team pursuit
2020
 3rd  Team pursuit, UEC European Under-23 Track Championships
2021
 2nd  Individual pursuit, UEC European Under-23 Track Championships
2022
 1st  Individual pursuit, UEC European Under-23 Track Championships
 National Championships
1st  Individual pursuit
1st  Team pursuit
 UCI Nations Cup
1st  Individual pursuit, Milton
2nd  Individual pursuit, Glasgow
3rd  Team pursuit, Milton

Road
2019
 3rd Time trial, National Junior Road Championships
 3rd Overall Internationale Cottbuser Junioren-Etappenfahrt

References

External links

2001 births
Living people
German male cyclists
German track cyclists
People from Zwickau
Cyclists from Saxony
21st-century German people